Helsing or Hellsing may refer to:

 Helsing (also styled Hellsing) a Swedish surname/soldier's name referring to the Swedish province (landskap) Hälsingland. Someone from Hälsingland is called a "Hälsinge", with the old (from the 17th to the 18th century) spelling that is "Hellsing" or "Helsing" (from Helsingland/Helsingeland)
 Van Helsing (disambiguation)
 Hellsing, a Japanese manga series

See also 
 Helsingborg, a town and the seat of Helsingborg Municipality, Scania, Sweden
 Helsinge, the municipal seat of Gribskov municipality in Region Hovedstaden on Zealand in Denmark
 Helsingør, a city in Denmark
 Helsinki, the capital of Finland